Rushville is a city in Sheridan County in the state of Nebraska, in the remote Sandhills Region. Its population was 890 at the 2010 census. It is the county seat of Sheridan County.

Name
Rushville was named from Rush Creek. In the Lakota language, Rushville is known as Owátȟokšu or Iwátȟokšu Otȟúŋwahe, meaning "Place where things are transported" or "Transportation City".

History
Rushville was platted in 1885 when the Fremont, Elkhorn, and Missouri Valley Railway was extended to that point. Rushville was incorporated in October 1885.

Geography
Rushville is located at  (42.717209, -102.460350).

Demographics

2010 census
As of the census of 2010, there were 890 people, 399 households, and 226 families living in the city. The racial makeup of the city was 73.8% White, 0.6% African American, 21.9% Native American, 0.1% Asian, 0.6% from other races, and 3.0% from two or more races. Hispanic or Latino of any race were 6.1% of the population.

There were 399 households, of which 30.8% had children under the age of 18 living with them, 39.1% were married couples living together, 13.5% had a female householder with no husband present, 4.0% had a male householder with no wife present, and 43.4% were non-families. 40.4% of all households were made up of individuals, and 20.3% had someone living alone who was 65 years of age or older. The average household size was 2.21 and the average family size was 2.96.

The median age in the city was 39.3 years. 28.5% of residents were under the age of 18; 4.5% were between the ages of 18 and 24; 21.5% were from 25 to 44; 25.4% were from 45 to 64; and 20% were 65 years of age or older. The gender makeup of the city was 43.8% male and 56.2% female.

2000 census
As of the census of 2000, there were 999 people, 419 households, and 266 families living in the city. The population density was 857.2 people per square mile (329.7/km). There were 518 housing units at an average density of 444.5 per square mile (170.9/km). The racial makeup of the city was 77.68% White, 0.10% African American, 18.32% Native American, 0.30% from other races, and 3.60% from two or more races. Hispanic or Latino of any race were 2.30% of the population.

There were 419 households, out of which 28.9% had children under the age of 18 living with them, 47.5% were married couples living together, 11.7% had a female householder with no husband present, and 36.3% were non-families. 33.7% of all households were made up of individuals, and 16.5% had someone living alone who was 65 years of age or older. The average household size was 2.30 and the average family size was 2.90.

In the city, the population was spread out, with 25.5% under the age of 18, 5.9% from 18 to 24, 25.3% from 25 to 44, 22.3% from 45 to 64, and 20.9% who were 65 years of age or older. The median age was 41 years. For every 100 females, there were 88.1 males. For every 100 females age 18 and over, there were 86.5 males.

As of 2000 the median income for a household in the city was $27,361, and the median income for a family was $36,100. Males had a median income of $23,750 versus $20,536 for females. The per capita income for the city was $14,586. About 13.5% of families and 16.4% of the population were below the poverty line, including 28.7% of those under age 18 and 7.0% of those age 65 or over.

Notable people
 John Gottschalk (b. 1943) - Retired publisher of the Omaha World-Herald and National president of the Boy Scouts of America
 Kelly Stouffer (b. 1964) - NFL quarterback for the Seattle Seahawks, who graduated from Rushville High School
 Hubert Stowitts (1892-1953) - Painter and dancer

References

Cities in Sheridan County, Nebraska
Cities in Nebraska
County seats in Nebraska